Samer Awad (born February 9, 1982, in Damascus, Syria) is a Syrian-Palestinian footballer. He  played for Al-Majd, which competes in the Syrian Premier League the top division in Syria. He plays as a midfielder, wearing the number 3 jersey for Al-Majd and for the Syrian national football team he wears the number 23 shirt. From 2017 up to the end of the season of 2019, he was wearing the jersey of Türkiyemspor Berlin. From 2019 until 2021, he was playing for 1.FC Novi Pazar 95 Berlin,  since 2020 he is playing once more for Türkiyemspor Berlin. 
His family are originally from Al-Zawiya, Safad in Northern Palestine.

International career

Appearances in major competitions

References

External links
 

1982 births
Living people
Syrian footballers
Al-Shorta Damascus players
Al-Majd players
2011 AFC Asian Cup players
Palestinian refugees
Expatriate footballers in Germany
Sportspeople from Damascus
Syrian expatriate sportspeople in Germany
Syrian Premier League players
Syria international footballers
Association football midfielders
Syrian people of Palestinian descent
Palestinian expatriates in Germany